Wyke (population 14,180 – 2001 UK census) is a ward within the City of Bradford Metropolitan District Council in the county of West Yorkshire, England, named after the village of Wyke. The population taken at the 2011 Census was 14,958.

As well as the area of Wyke, the ward includes the adjoining hamlet of Lower Wyke, the area around Carr House, known as Carr House Gate, part of Oakenshaw (the main part of which is in Kirklees), and most of Low Moor. It is bordered on the east side by the M606 motorway and extends up to the Staygate roundabout on the north.

Wyke Methodist Church is located at Laverack Field in Wyke. The South Bradford Local History Alliance reports that "the Wesleyan movement held meetings in Wyke in the mid-19th century at a property in Wyke Lane known as Bink’s Cottage, and later at the home of Joseph Clark near the Temperance Hall. The original chapel was built in 1869 and was officially opened in 1871. A Sunday School was added in 1913."

Councillors 

Wyke is represented on Bradford Council by three Labour Party councillors, David Warburton, Sarah Ferriby and Rosie Watson.

 indicates seat up for re-election.

See also
Listed buildings in Wyke

References

 BCSP (Internet Explorer only)
 BBC election results
 Council ward profile (pdf)

External links

 
 Wyke Viaduct.

Wards of Bradford
Villages in West Yorkshire